Pterostylis oliveri is a species of greenhood orchid endemic to New Zealand. Flowering have plants spreading leaves on the flowering stem and a single green and white flower with a strongly down-curved dorsal sepal and long, tapering lateral sepals.

Description
Pterostylis oliveri is a terrestrial, perennial, deciduous, herb with an underground tuber. The dorsal sepal and petals are fused, forming a hood or "galea" over the column. There is a gap between the galea and the lateral sepals which have long, tapering tips, spread apart from each other and are erect or turned back behind the galea. The labellum is gently curved and protrudes above the sinus between the lateral sepals. Flowering occurs in December and January.

Taxonomy and naming
Pterostylis oliveri was first formally described by Donald Petrie and the description was published in Transactions and Proceedings of the New Zealand Institute in 1894. The specific epithet (oliveri) honours Professor Daniel Oliver of Kew Gardens for his assistance to Petrie.

Distribution and habitat
Oliver's greenhood grows in forest and scrub, often on the side of streams or in dense leaf litter on the South Island from near Nelson to Arthurs Pass National Park.

Conservation
Pterostylis oliveri is classed as "not threatened".

References

oliveri
Plants described in 1894
Endemic orchids of New Zealand